East Choutapalem is a village in Darsi Mandal, Prakasam District of Andhra Pradesh state, India.

References

Villages in Prakasam district